Shahid Chamran University of Ahvaz is a major Iranian University in Ahvaz, Khuzestan, Iran. By the ISC ranking, Shahid Chamran University of Ahvaz is 13th largest and top university in Iran. SCU University is considered one of Iran's "Grade A" universities by Iranian Ministry of Science. The campus today has  and houses 13 colleges. In 2010, 4798 students were enrolled.

In 1982 the university was renamed to "Shahid Chamran University of Ahvaz" to commemorate Mostafa Chamran.

In 1986, under national legislation, the Schools of Medicine, Health, Dental, Nursing, and Pharmacy, separated off into an independent Ahvaz Jundishapur University of Medical Sciences, operated under the supervision of the new Ministry of Health and Medical Education.

Faculties

Faculty of Sciences:
Department of Physics
Department of Chemistry
Department of Biology
Department of Genetics.
Faculty of Engineering:
Department of Electrical Engineering
Department of Mechanical Engineering
Department of Computer Engineering
Department of Civil Engineering
Department of Metallurgical Engineering
Department of Architecture.
Faculty of Literature:
Department of Persian Language
Department of English Language
Department of French Language
Department of History.
Faculty of Agriculture:
Department of Agronomy
Department of Agriculture Machinery
Department of Horticulture
Department of Plant Protection
Department of Soil Science.
Faculty of Veterinary Medicine:
Department of Basic Sciences
Department of Pathology
Department of Hygiene
Department of Clinical Sciences.
Faculty of Physical Education.
Faculty of Education and Psychology:
Department of Education
Department of Psychology
Department of Library and Information Science.
Faculty of Mathematics and Statistics:
Department of Mathematical Science
Department of Computer Science
Department of Statistics.
Faculty of Water Science Engineering:
Department of Hydrology
Department of Water Structures Engineering
Department of Irrigation & Drainage
Department of Civil & Environmental Engineering.
Faculty of Shushtar Education College.
Faculty of Theology and Islamic Thought.
Faculty of Economic and Social Sciences:
Department of Economic
Department of Business Administration	
Department of Accounting
Department of Social Sciences
Department of Law
Department of Political Science.

See also
Academy of Gondishapur
Ahvaz Jundishapur University of Medical Sciences
Higher education in Iran
List of Iranian Universities

References

 Piyrnia, Mansoureh. Salar Zanana Iran. 1995. Maryland: Mehran Iran Publishing.
 Gholamali Rahnavard, Chief Information Officer at Shahid Chamran University, 2009

External links

Shahid Chamran University of Ahvaz official website
Office of Information Technology | Shahid Chamran University of Ahvaz

Shahid Chamran University of Ahvaz
Educational institutions established in 1955
Ahvaz
1955 establishments in Iran